Van Gordon Sauter (born September 14, 1935) is a television executive who was the president of CBS News and the president of Fox News. He is  a member of the Brown political family of California.

Education 
Sauter graduated with a bachelor's degree in English from Ohio University in 1957 and a master's degree in journalism from the University of Missouri in 1959.  After leaving college, he worked as a reporter and staff writer for newspapers in Massachusetts, Detroit, and Chicago.

Career 
Sauter was a two-time president of CBS News, from 1982 to 1983 and again in 1986. He held many other positions at CBS including being an executive producer for CBS News radio from 1970 until 1972, Paris bureau chief of CBS News from 1975 until 1976, and president of CBS Sports from 1980 until 1982.  

Sauter resigned from CBS News in 1986.  After leaving CBS News, he helped develop a talk show for Jesse Jackson.

In 1992, he was hired to be the president of the new Fox News division.  He left Fox News when he became heavily involved in his wife's 1994 campaign for California governor.

Personal life 
He has been married to former California Treasurer Kathleen Brown, the sister and daughter of former California governors Jerry Brown and Pat Brown.

References

External links

1935 births
Brown family (California)
Businesspeople from California
Businesspeople from Ohio
CBS News people
Fox News people
Living people